Talibon, officially the Municipality of Talibon, is a 1st class municipality in the province of Bohol, Philippines. According to the 2020 census, it has a population of 71,272 people.

Talibon is the seat of the diocese of Talibon and is the resident town of the bishop.

The town of Talibon, Bohol celebrates its feast on the last Saturday of May to honor the town patron, the Blessed Trinity.

Islands in Talibon including Nocnocan, Calituban, and Guindacpan are considered to be one of the most densely populated islands in the world.

Etymology

The name Talibon is said to come from the word talibong which means bolo or spear, an instrument used in gold mining. There is no actual record to show how the name came about but as per the records of the travels of Jesuit missionary Fr. Juan de Torres, S.J., he went to the gold mines of Talibong. It already had its name before the first arrival of the first Spanish missionary.

History

According to archival researches of Fr. Jose Maria Luengo, priest, historian, and founder of the Mater Dei College of Tubigon, Talibon traces its history back to the time of Ferdinand Magellan after his death on 27 April 1521. Escaping from the hands of Lapu-Lapu's men, who were bent on revenge for the raping of 50 virgins of Cebu, the ship Trinidad sailed in the direction of Getafe and Talibon, where some of the crew disembarked and mingled with the natives of the place.

Taking native wives and teaching them the rudiments of Christianity, they dedicated the place where they lived to the Most Holy Trinity (Santisima Trinidad) in honor of the patrons of their fateful ship. The survivors became the first lay missionaries to Bohol and Fr. Luengo called them the Trinidad Christians of Talibon.

In 1830, Talibon was established as an independent municipality from Inabanga. The following year, Talibon became a parish dedicated to the Most Holy Trinity, with Fr. Ramon de Santa Ana as the first parish priest.

At first, a ramshackle hut built by the natives served as the church but in 1852 construction of the permanent church was started. With forced labor and the use of blocks of coral rocks, the church was built on an elevated plain overlooking the sea and finished in 1899.

In June 1942, the locals woke up one morning to see truckloads of heavily armed troops of the Imperial Japanese Army's 175th Infantry Battalion in Poblacion. It was the first entry of the Japanese troops in the comparatively peaceful town. Before properly settling down, the Talibon Central Elementary School became the headquarters of the Japanese soldiers. After a few days, the invaders ransacked the cabinets in the municipal building for important records. They went from house to house, rounded up the civilians and ordered them to stay at the municipal hall. Through an interpreter, a Japanese intelligence officer named 1st Lt. Mitsuo Kimura inquired for the municipal officials and after learning they had fled, he ordered the people to organize a civil government by electing the necessary officials. The Japanese threatened to burn all the houses and buildings in Poblacion if the people failed to organize the government. To save the town from the possibility of being reduced to ashes, the people organized a civil government and appointed the young lawyer, Atty. Maximino C. Boiser as municipal mayor.

During the time of World War II, a guerrilla force against the Japanese 175th Infantry Battalion was secretly organized and then took control and authority over the town of Talibon. Former Senator Carlos P. Garcia acted as high adviser of the group. While Talibon was under Japanese occupation, he narrowly escaped capture by fleeing with his family to Leyte. In reprisal, the Japanese soldiers in Talibon, through the leadership of battalion commander Maj. Ichiro Tokogawa, burned down the Garcia house on 4 July 1942 and tortured volunteer guard Cesario Avergonzado for allegedly misleading them. Later on in 1943, Atty. Maximino C. Boiser, the municipal mayor of Talibon at that time, was executed by the guerillas for conspiring with the Japanese forces according to local witnesses.

In 1957, when Carlos P. Garcia became the eighth president of the Philippines, the church was renovated. According to the members of the prominent Boiser family of Talibon, the president would regularly visit Mr. Justo C. Boiser's house in Poblacion just to have lunch with him and his family as both sides were politically related. In honor of the Boisers in Talibon, a street was named after the family, which is located still in Poblacion.

In 1986, the Diocese of Talibon was created.

Geography

The town of Talibon is located on the northern side of Bohol. It is bounded on the east by Bien Unido, on the south by Trinidad on the north by Camotes Sea and on the west by Getafe.

It can be accessed by boat direct from Cebu City or via Tubigon then by land from Tubigon to Talibon.

Barangays

Talibon comprises 25 barangays: 17 mainland and 8 island barangays.

Climate

Demographics

Economy

Major industries in Talibon are farming and fishing with major products such as rice, corn, copra, banana, root crops, and seafood. It is quickly becoming a hub for retailers, wholesalers, and traders. The municipality is home to one of the branches of Cebu-based Alturas Group of Companies, which has established a mall and supermarket in the area.

The locals are also into seaweed farming, rice farming, watermelon farming, and making of fish traps, hats, and pottery. Silica, limestone, diorites, sand, iron ore, and gravel abound and quarrying of these minerals are a large industry at present. These minerals are shipped to Cebu and Iligan aboard bulk carriers and barges as these locations are known for cement production and mineral processing.

Eco-tourism

Talibon for years has its share of foreign and domestic tourists who were lured to the town for its unexploited beaches, fresh seafood such as crabs and prawns, friendliness of the people and the general atmosphere of peace and order in the town and the neighboring barrios.

People also come to see the historic site, the Carlos P. Garcia Monument and Park; the location of which is the birthplace of this son of Talibon who played an important role during the guerilla movement and more so when he became the 4th President of the Republic of the Philippines.

There are islands that have long been unexploited and surrounded by crystal clear waters and rich marine life. One such islet is the Bongan sandbar, a breathtaking long sandy white beach devoid of vegetation whatsoever. It is a good place to swim, snorkel or scuba dive.

A relatively unknown natural treasure is the Danajon Bank, which is the Philippines' only double barrier reef and one of the few documented double barrier reefs in the world. A very rare geological formation, it comprises two sets of large coral reefs that formed offshore on a submarine ridge due to a combination of favorable tidal currents and coral growth in the area. Talibon town shares responsibility over Danajon together with 9 other Bohol towns that have jurisdiction over the reef.

Danajon Bank is home to a vast array of commercially valuable reef fishes, shellfish, crustaceans and invertebrates such as sea cucumbers and sea urchins. Its extensive seagrass beds are nursery and feeding grounds for various species of rabbitfish (siganids) and sea horses, while its mangroves are spawning habitats for crustaceans, shrimps and various fishes.

In order to showcase and promote efforts to protect and manage Danajon Bank, the Municipal Government of Talibon opened the CRM Interpretive Center, otherwise known as the Fisheries and Coastal Resource Management Interpretive Center (FCRMIC). Aside from a very educational gallery, the Center boasts a 3D model of Danajon Bank, the first of its kind in Bohol and even in the whole of the Visayas. It is now becoming a drop-in site for school and foreign tours alike.

Aware of the vast tourism potential of Talibon, the present administration has set up an "Eco-Tourism Program" geared towards the development and promotion of Talibon's assets.

The winding Ipil River is another area that has to be promoted for boating, kayaking, and other activities such as fishing, swimming, and the gathering of shells and mollusks that abound in the area. Going inland from the river, one will see wild ducks, herons, and egrets; and in San Isidro, a mangrove area has become the dwelling place of monkeys. Another attraction is the centuries-old piyapi trees growing abundantly in the area.

Education

Almost every barangay in Talibon's vicinity has its public elementary school, making students, teachers, and parents alike have a sufficient array of choices. The same goes for secondary schools as it has an abundant selection to private and public education.

Diocese of Talibon

The diocese of Talibon comprises half of the civil province of Bohol.

The territory, covered by the diocese of Talibon, extends from the town of Inabanga on the northwest, through Carmen in the interior, and down to Jagna on the southeast. Its inland boundary bisects the island northwest—southeast, with the other half of the island under the jurisdiction of the diocese of Tagbilaran.

The first batch of missionaries to arrive were the Augustinian Recollects who came in 1565. When the Jesuits arrived in 1596 and reached the area of Talibon, they were surprised to discover that a Christian community already existed in the area, owing to the Spanish–Talibongnon intermarriages dating back to the 1520s.

After the Jesuits came, the faith spread fast revolts in the country against Spain. Tamblot revolted in 1622. Although his success lasted only for six months, his revolt is recorded as the first unbeaten revolt in Philippine history. In 1744, Dagohoy revolted and gained independence for the island of Bohol for eighty years.

On 8 November 1941, the Diocese of Tagbilaran was established and was given jurisdiction over the entire province of Bohol, separating it from Cebu, its mother diocese. On 9 January 1986, the new Diocese of Talibon was created, separating half of Bohol from the Diocese of Tagbilaran. Most Rev. Christian Vicente Fernandez Noel, D.D., was appointed as its first bishop in September 1986 and whose office he held until Pope Francis appointed Most Rev. Patrick Daniel Y. Parcon, D.D. on 6 June 2014 as its second bishop, and was eventually installed on 22 August 2014.

To this day, there are 25 parishes in the diocese, ministered by 50 priests. There are also 35 religious sisters active in the running of 16 secondary Catholic schools.

Notable personalities

 Bernardito Auza, Archbishop, Apostolic Nuncio of Vatican to Spain
 Nonito Donaire, World Champion Boxer
 Carlos P. Garcia, eighth President of the Philippines
 Lauro Mumar, PBA Player

References

External links

 [ Philippine Standard Geographic Code]
Talibon
Municipality of Talibon
Talibon Bohol News

Municipalities of Bohol